WJDS may refer to:

 WJDS (FM), a radio station (88.7 FM) licensed to serve Sparta, Georgia, United States
 WJDS-LP, a low-power radio station (106.9 FM) licensed to serve Palm Coast, Florida, United States